Horinouchi may refer to:

Horinouchi, Niigata, a former town in Kitauonuma District, Niigata Prefecture, Japan
Horinouchi Station, a railway station in Yokosuka, Kanagawa Prefecture, Japan

People with the surname
, Japanese diplomat

See also
Horiuchi, a Japanese surname

Japanese-language surnames